Delroy Morgan (born 4 March 1967) is a Jamaican cricketer. He played in 62 first-class and 39 List A matches for the Jamaican cricket team from 1986 to 1998.

See also
 List of Jamaican representative cricketers

References

External links
 

1967 births
Living people
Jamaican cricketers
Jamaica cricketers
Sportspeople from Kingston, Jamaica